Paolo Thaon di Revel (P430) is the lead ship of Paolo Thaon di Revel-class offshore patrol vessel.

Development and design 

The ships were designed as a "multipurpose offshore patrol vessel". The first seven vessels are built with different configurations: a basic "light" variant for the patrol task, an enhanced configuration with better self-defence capacity and a "full" variant incorporating a much broader capability. Paolo Thaon di Revel, as the lead ship of the class, is built in the "light" configuration.

The Italian Navy ordered the new MBDA TESEO MK/2E heavy-duty missile (TESEO "EVO"), a long-range anti-ship missile with also strategic land attack capability. The missile will have a new terminal "head" with dual RF seeker (Radio Frequency) and, presumably, date the need to even attack ground targets, IIR (Imaging IR). Compared to the predecessor OTOMAT/TESEO, the TESEO "EVO" MK/2E has a double range or more than 360 km. Former OTOMAT is accredited for a range of action of more than 180 km.

Construction and career
Paolo Thaon di Revel was laid down on 9 May 2017 at Fincantieri Muggiano and launched on 15 June 2019. Expected to be commissioned in May 2021. 15 November 2019, she underwent her first sea trial off the Gulf of La Spezia. The vessel was delivered to the Italian Navy in March, 2022.

In August 2022, the ship, with one SH-90A helicopter embarked, operates as flagship of Operation AGENOR, the military pillar of the European-led Maritime Awareness in the Strait of Hormuz (EMASoH), being deployed in the Gulf region, Strait of Hormuz, and the Gulf of Oman, to promote the safe passage of merchant shipping in the region.

References

External links
 Varata nave Paolo Thaon di Revel Marina Militare website

2019 ships
Ships built by Fincantieri
Frigates of the Italian Navy